Psalms for the Dead is the eleventh studio album by the Swedish doom metal band Candlemass, released on 8 June 2012. At the time of its release, the band stated that this would be their final album, though bassist and founding member Leif Edling has since retracted this claim. Psalms for the Dead is, however, the last Candlemass album recorded with singer Robert Lowe, who left the band just six days before its release.

The album would become Candlemass' last full-length release in over half a decade, until the 2019 release of their twelfth studio album The Door to Doom; during those seven years, however, the band released two EPs featuring new material: Death Thy Lover (2016) and House of Doom (2018).

Track listing

Personnel
Candlemass
 Robert Lowe - vocals
 Mats Björkman - rhythm guitar
 Lars Johansson - lead guitars
 Leif Edling - bass, producer
 Jan Lindh - drums

Additional musicians
Carl Westholm - keyboards
Mark Robertson - backing vocals

Production
Andreas Bauman - engineer
Chris Laney - engineer, mixing
Sören von Malmborg - mastering
Erik Rovanperä - cover art
Tomas Arfert - additional graphics

Charts

References 

Candlemass (band) albums
2012 albums
Napalm Records albums